Mosting, Møsting or Mösting may refer to:

People
Johan Sigismund von Møsting
Frederikke Louise Møsting, maid-of-honor of Caroline Matilda of Great Britain

Places
Cape Møsting, Greenland
Mösting (crater) in the moon
Møstings Hus